Kent University may refer to:

University of Kent (formerly the University of Kent at Canterbury) in the United Kingdom
Kent State University, Ohio, United States